Bobby Graham (born 22 November 1944) is a Scottish retired professional footballer who played for Liverpool during the 1960s.

Early years and Liverpool

Born in Motherwell, North Lanarkshire, Scotland, Graham played for Motherwell Bridge Works as an amateur before Bill Shankly signed him for Liverpool as 17-year-old in November 1961.

A forward, Graham scored on his full debut, a 6-1 victory over KR Reykjavik on 14 September 1964 in a European Cup preliminary round 2nd leg tie at Anfield. He scored a hat-trick in his first league game against Aston Villa 12 days later on 26 September, the game finished 5-1 to the Reds with Graham's goals coming in the 6th, 64th and 86th minutes.

Graham was at Liverpool at an unfortunate time for himself as he found it difficult to dislodge the successful strike partnership of Ian St John and Roger Hunt and found first team appearances hard to come by. Such was the dominance of both St John and Hunt he missed out on the 1965 FA Cup Final win and only made 1 appearance during the Reds run to the league title the following season, obviously, not enough to gain him a medal.

The 1969–70 season was the most successful for him in a red shirt, with Hunt and St John both pensioned off he made 54 (ever present) first-team appearances and scored 21 goals which included a stunning strike in the Merseyside derby at Goodison Park, the same game that saw Everton's Sandy Brown score 'that' infamous own goal. Shortly afterwards, though, two new strikers arrived in the form of Kevin Keegan from Scunthorpe United and John Toshack from Cardiff City, Graham lost his place once again.

Coventry City and Tranmere Rovers

In March 1972, he was allowed to leave Anfield and moved to Highfield Road and Coventry City where he linked up with former teammate St John once more, again he struggled to get 1st team recognition, even going out on loan to Tranmere Rovers, when St John was in charge, for 10 games. Graham ended his short association with the Sky Blues and returned to Scotland.

Motherwell

Graham moved to his home town club Motherwell. Ian St John again signed him for the Fir Park club and by the end of his first season he had shown why 'The Saint' had shown such faith, he finished top scorer. A young Willie Pettigrew was added to the side the following season and the pair formed a lethal partnership that terrorised Scottish defences for four seasons. When Crawford Boyd was later interviewed for the Queen of the South F.C. website, Boyd listed Bobby Graham as the best player that he played against in his time at Queens.

Hamilton Academical

After 132 games and 37 goals Graham joined Hamilton Academical in 1977 for a, then, record transfer fee of £15,000, he, again, made over 100 appearances scoring 42 times. He then left Hamilton and senior football when he ended his playing days at Shotts Bon Accord in the Scottish junior football scene.

References

External links
Player profile at LFChistory.net
Former players at Motherwellfc.co.uk

1944 births
Living people
Scottish footballers
Liverpool F.C. players
Coventry City F.C. players
Tranmere Rovers F.C. players
Motherwell F.C. players
Hamilton Academical F.C. players
Shotts Bon Accord F.C. players
Scottish Football League players
English Football League players
Association football forwards
Footballers from Motherwell